Utah Blaine is a 1957 American Western film directed by Fred F. Sears and starring Rory Calhoun. It was based on a novel by Louis L'Amour.

Plot
After saving a rancher from hanging, cowboy Mike "Utah" Blaine learns that his enemy Rink Witter is now a hired gun working for wealthy Russ Nevers, who is out to own every piece of land in the territory.

Utah teams up with Angie Kinyon, another murdered landowner's daughter, and rancher Mary Blake to maintain lawful ownership of their properties. He has a fistfight with Gus Ortmann, a large and popular fellow in town who misunderstands Utah's purpose. Witter then pulls a gun, but Utah's old pal Rip Coker shoots it from his hand.

Witter threatens Angie while trying to find Utah. When Gus tries to defend her while hiding in the cellar, Witter shoots him. Utah and Rip shoot some of the vigilantes but Witter and the rest escape. The townspeople rally to Utah's side so that when Nevers and Witter confront him, dozens of guns end up aimed at them. In the final shootout Nevers is the first one killed and Utah eventually kills Witter. Utah ends up with a ranch of his own and with Angie as well.

Cast
 Rory Calhoun as Utah Blaine
 Susan Cummings as Angie Kinyon
 Angela Stevens as Mary Blake
 Max Baer as Gus Ortmann
 Ray Teal as Nevers
 Paul Langton as Rip Coker
 George Keymas as Rink Witter

References

External links

Review of film at Variety

1957 films
1957 Western (genre) films
Films based on American novels
American Western (genre) films
Films directed by Fred F. Sears
1950s English-language films
1950s American films